Gunnar Mathisen (6 October 1936 – 14 July 2022) was a Norwegian politician for the Labour Party. He was elected deputy representative to the Storting for the period 1992–1997 from the constituency of Finnmark. From 1996 to 1997 he met regularly in the Storting replacing Karl Eirik Schjøtt-Pedersen who was Minister of Fisheries. In the Storting, she was a member of the Standing Committee on Family, Cultural Affairs and Administration from 1996 to 1997.

Mathisen died on 14 July 2022.

References

1936 births
2022 deaths
Labour Party (Norway) politicians
Deputy members of the Storting
Finnmark politicians
20th-century Norwegian politicians